Santa Lucía is a municipality in the Honduran department of Francisco Morazán.

History 

There is no exact data on its beginnings, although it is known that it is one of the oldest towns, that it was inhabited before the arrival of the Spanish. Although some writers have affirmed that mining began in 1580, there are documents that indicate that around 1540 it had already been visited by the first Spanish explorers who were looking for mineral veins and then began to exploit its rich mines.

On November 12, 1820, Santa Lucía was established as a municipality in the Department of Tegucigalpa.

Tourism 

Santa Lucia is a common tourist destinations for those who visit the capital of the country, with a mild climate, the main town can be comfortably explored on foot starting with a lagoon full of life, ducks and turtles call it home and stroll quietly among visitors and in which you can rent rowing boats to explore it, making the experience even more entertaining.The historic center of Santa Lucia is one of the best preserved in Honduras.

The town is full of viewpoints with a view of the capital of the country, several cafes and restaurants are within reach in these viewpoints which has become an opportunity to enjoy the best coffees and dishes in Honduras. The town quite conserves its original colonial structure, from the houses, the stone streets, alleys, and its church, which draws quite a lot of attention because there have been few modern constructions in it.

Municipalities of the Francisco Morazán Department